The Sigre River is a river in the Gracias a Dios Department,  Honduras. It flows into the Brus Lagoon, which itself lies adjacent to the Caribbean Sea.

See also
List of rivers of Honduras

References

Rivers of Honduras